The 1984 autobiography by Julian Lloyd Webber, Travels with My Cello, covers his childhood through to travelling the world as a concert performer in the early 1980s.

References 
Glenn Garlick , "Travels with my Cello," (review essay), The Washington Post, March 4, 1985, B6.

Travel autobiographies
Biographies about musicians
1984 non-fiction books
Cellos